The Venetian regional election of 2000 took place on 16 April 2000.

Giancarlo Galan (Forza Italia, Pole for Freedoms) was re-elected for the third time President of the Region by a landslide over the centre-left candidate Massimo Cacciari (The Democrats).

Forza Italia, this time in alliance also with the Northern League, had its best result ever and was by far the largest party in the election, receiving 30.3% of the regional vote.

Electoral system
Regional elections in Veneto were ruled by the "Tatarella law" (approved in 1995), which provided for a mixed electoral system: four fifths of the regional councilors were elected in provincial constituencies by proportional representation, using the largest remainder method with a droop quota and open lists, while the residual votes and the unassigned seats were grouped into a "single regional constituency", where the whole ratios and the highest remainders were divided with the Hare method among the provincial party lists; one fifth of the council seats instead was reserved for regional lists and assigned with a majoritarian system: the leader of the regional list that scored the highest number of votes was elected to the presidency of the Region while the other candidates were elected regional councilors.

A threshold of 3% had been established for the provincial lists, which, however, could still have entered the regional council if the regional list to which they were connected had scored at least 5% of valid votes.

The panachage was also allowed: the voter can indicate a candidate for the presidency but prefer a provincial list connected to another candidate.

Parties and candidates

Results

Aftermath
After the election, Giancarlo Galan formed his second government, while Enrico Cavaliere (Liga Veneta) was elected President of the Regional Council. Forza Italia had the lion share in the government, including the posts of President, Vice President and Minister of Health.

References

Elections in Veneto
2000 elections in Italy